The 30th Chicago Film Critics Association Awards were announced on December 12, 2017.  The awards honor the best in film for 2017. The nominations were announced on December 10. Call Me by Your Name received the most nominations (8), followed by The Shape of Water (7), Dunkirk (6), Lady Bird (6) and Phantom Thread (6).

Winners and nominees
The winners and nominees for the 30th Chicago Film Critics Association Awards are as follows:

Awards

Awards breakdown 
The following films received multiple nominations:

The following films received multiple wins:

References

External links
 

 2017
2017 film awards